The Tams are an American vocal group from Atlanta, Georgia, who enjoyed their greatest chart success in the 1960s, but continued to chart in the 1970s, and the 1980s. Two separate lineups of the group continue to perform and record. One lineup, called 'The Original Tams with R. L. Smith',  features original member Robert Lee Smith, and the other lineup is under the leadership of Little Red, the son of longtime member Charles Pope and the nephew of group co-founder Joe Pope.

Career
The band formed in 1960, and took their name from the Tam o'shanter hats they wore on stage. By 1962, they had a hit single on Arlen Records. "Untie Me", a Joe South composition, became a Top 20 on the Billboard R&B chart. The follow-up releases largely failed until 1964, when "What Kind of Fool (Do You Think I Am)", reached the Top 10 on the US Billboard Hot 100. The song spent three weeks at number one on the Cash Box R&B chart. Many of their popular hits were written by Ray Whitley.

"Hey Girl Don't Bother Me" was also a modest US hit the same year. The Tams had only one further major US hit (in 1968) when "Be Young, Be Foolish, Be Happy", peaked at #26 on the US R&B chart, and subsequently made the UK Top 40 in 1970.

Their 1965 recording "I've Been Hurt" was their biggest regional hit (based on sales and airplay) prior to 1980.

The group reached the Number one slot in the UK Singles Chart in September 1971, with the re-issue of "Hey Girl Don't Bother Me", thanks to its initial support from the then thriving UK Northern soul scene. The song also topped the Irish Singles Chart, making them the first African-American group to have a number-one single in Ireland.

The group did not chart again until 1987, when their song "There Ain't Nothing Like Shaggin'" reached #21 in UK, propelled by a regionally-popular dance known as the Carolina shag, which featured heavily in the subsequent 1989 film, Shag. However, the track was banned by the BBC because the word "shag" means "to have sexual intercourse" in colloquial British English.

Still quite popular in the Southeastern United States, they continue to record new music and perform at well-attended concerts. In 1999, they were featured performers with Jimmy Buffett on his CD, Beach House on the Moon, and also toured with him around the country.

American singer-songwriter Tameka Harris, born in 1975, is the daughter of Dianne Cottle-Pope and Charles Pope. Charles Pope died from Alzheimer's disease on July 11, 2013, at the age of 76.

Later years
In recent years the group has been led by  Albert "Little Red" Cottle Jr., the son of former member Albert Cottle.

Members
 Joseph Pope (born Joseph Lee Pope, November 6, 1933, Atlanta, Georgia; died March 16, 1996)
 Robert Lee Smith (born March 18, 1950)
 Horace Key (born April 13, 1934, Atlanta, Georgia, died 1995)
 Charles Pope (born Charles Walter Pope, August 7, 1936, Atlanta, Georgia; died July 11, 2013)
 Floyd Ashton (born August 15, 1933) (member from 1960 to 1963)
 Little Red aka Lil' Red (born August 2, 1969)

Discography

Singles

See also
List of artists who reached number one on the UK Singles Chart
List of artists who reached number one in Ireland
Beach music
List of 1960s one-hit wonders in the United States

Bibliography
 The New Musical Express Book of Rock, 1975, Star Books,

References

External links
 
 The Original Joe Pope Tams website

American soul musical groups
Musical groups from Atlanta
Musical groups established in 1960
Northern soul musicians
African-American musical groups
1960 establishments in Georgia (U.S. state)